The 2013 Rally de Portugal was the fourth round of the 2013 World Rally Championship season. The event was based in Faro, Portugal, and started on 11 April and was concluded on 14 April after fifteen special stages, totaling 387 competitive kilometres, including a street stage in Lisbon on 12 April.

Report

Before the rally
The rally was preceded by the "Fafe Rally Sprint", a single-stage exhibition event run over the famous Fafe stages in the country's north which was won by Citroën Total Abu Dhabi WRT driver Dani Sordo.
Dani Sordo won the rally's qualifying stage (5 km) and elected to run thirteenth (last WRC) on the road as a result. His strategy was followed by all competitors, resulting in an inverted starting order for the rally's first day.

Entry list
Thirteen World Rally Cars were entered into the event, as were twenty entries in the newly formed WRC-2 championship for cars built to Group N and Super 2000 regulations and nine WRC-3 entries. There was also ten entries in the debut of the Junior WRC.

Results

Event standings

 – The Junior WRC features only the first 11 stages of the rally.

Special stages

Power Stage
The "Power stage" was a  stage at the end of the rally.

Notable retirements

Championship standings after the event

FIA World Rally Championship for Drivers

Points are awarded to the top 10 classified finishers.

FIA World Rally Championship for Manufacturers

WRC2 Drivers' championship

WRC3 Drivers' Championship

Junior WRC Drivers' Championship
Points are awarded to the top 10 classified finishers, and one point for winning a stage. Five best results of the season are counted towards the final score.

Drivers' championship

Notes
 1 refers to the number of stages won, where a bonus point is awarded per stage win.

Co-drivers' championship

Notes
 1 refers to the number of stages won, where a bonus point is awarded per stage win.

References

Portugal
Rally de Portugal
Rally de Portugal